Kerimäki is a former municipality of Finland. It was consolidated with the town of Savonlinna on January 1, 2013.

It is located in the province of Eastern Finland and is part of the Southern Savonia region. The municipality was unilingually Finnish.

There are over 3,000 seats inside the structure, which can hold 5,000 people at a time.

Lake Puruvesi, which lies less than a kilometre away from the church, is one of the clearest lakes in the world. The water is pure enough to be potable.

References

External links

Kerimäki – Official website 

Savonlinna
Former municipalities of Finland
Populated places disestablished in 2013
Populated places established in 1642
1642 establishments in Sweden